The 20th Air Division is an inactive United States Air Force organization.  Its last assignment was with Tactical Air Command at Tyndall Air Force Base, Florida where it was inactivated on 1 March 1983.

During most of the division's history it served with Air Defense Command as a regional command and control headquarters.  Between 1955 and 1967 the division controlled air defense units in the central United States. It controlled a slightly different areas of the midwestern US from 1955 to 1960 and again from 1966 to 1967.  Its area of responsibility shifted to the east coast if the United States from 1969 to 1983.  It was shifted to its final station on paper in 1983 and was immediately inactivated.

History
The 20th Air Division was assigned to Air Defense Command (ADC) for most of its existence.  It served as a regional command and control headquarters, controlling fighter interceptor and radar units over several areas of responsibility during the Cold War.  For three years it also commanded a surface-to-air missile squadron.

The division was initially activated as an intermediate command organization under Central Air Defense Force at Grandview Air Force Base (later Richards-Gebaur Air Force Base) in June 1955. The division was responsible for the interceptor and radar units within an area that covered parts of Nebraska, Oklahoma, Arkansas, Illinois, Iowa, and virtually all of Kansas and Missouri.

On 1 October 1959 ADC activated the Sioux City Air Defense Sector and its Semi Automatic Ground Environment (SAGE) DC-22 Direction Center and assigned it to the division. The 20th also operated a Manual Control Center (MCC-2) at Richards-Gebaur.  The division was inactivated in 1960 when ADC reorganized its regional air defense units, and the 33d Air Division assumed command of most of its former units.

The division was reactivated in 1966 under Tenth Air Force as a SAGE organization, replacing the Chicago Air Defense Sector when ADC discontinued its air defense sectors and replaced them with air divisions. The 20th provided air defense from the Truax Field, Wisconsin DC-7/CC-2 SAGE blockhouse for parts of Wisconsin, Minnesota, Iowa, Missouri, Arkansas, Tennessee, Kentucky, Indiana, and all of Illinois. The division also acted as the 20th NORAD Region after activation of the North American Air Defense Command (NORAD) Combat Operations Center at the Cheyenne Mountain Complex, Colorado.  Operational control of the division was transferred to NORAD from ADC.

In addition to the active duty interceptor and radar units, the division supervised Air National Guard units that flew interception sorties using (among other aircraft) McDonnell F-101 Voodoos and Convair F-106 Delta Darts. At the same time the division controlled numerous radar squadrons.  It was inactivated in 1967 as part of an ADC consolidation of intermediate level command and control organizations, driven by budget reductions required to fund USAF operations in Southeast Asia.

The 20th Air Division was activated for a third time in November 1969 under Aerospace Defense Command (ADCOM). The division provided air defense for virtually all of the southeastern United States, except for most of Louisiana from the SAGE DC-4 blockhouse at Fort Lee Air Force Station, Virginia. The division also controlled a CIM-10 Bomarc surface-to-air anti-aircraft missile squadron near Langley Air Force Base until the squadron's inactivation in October 1972.

ADCOM was inactivated on 1 October 1979. The atmospheric defense resources (interceptors and warning radars) of ADCOM were reassigned to Tactical Air Command, which formed Air Defense, Tactical Air Command as the headquarters to control them. After 1981, the division controlled units equipped with McDonnell Douglas F-15 Eagle aircraft.  Its subordinate units continued to participate in intensive academic training, numerous multi-region simulated (non-flying) exercises, and flying exercises.

The division moved to Tyndall Air Force Base, Florida in March 1983 where it was inactivated and its mission, personnel and equipment were transferred to the Southeast Air Defense Sector.

Lineage
 Established as the 20 Air Division (Defense) on 8 June 1955
 Activated on 8 October 1955
 Inactivated on 1 January 1960
 Activated on 20 January 1966 (not organized)
 Organized on 1 April 1966
 Discontinued and inactivated, on 31 December 1967
 Activated on 19 November 1969
 Inactivated on 1 March 1983

Assignments
 Central Air Defense Force, 8 October 1955 – 1 January 1960
 Air Defense Command, 20 January 1966
 Tenth Air Force, 1 April 1966 – 31 December 1967
 Aerospace Defense Command, 19 November 1969
 Air Defense, Tactical Air Command, 1 October 1979 – 1 March 1983

Stations
 Grandview Air Force Base (later, Richards Gebaur Air Force Base0, Missouri, 8 October 1955 – 1 January 1960
 Truax Field, Wisconsin, 1 April 1966 – 31 December 1967
 Fort Lee Air Force Station, Virginia, 19 November 1969
 Tyndall Air Force Base, Florida, 1 March 1983

Components

Sector
 Sioux City Air Defense Sector: 1 October 1959 – 1 January 1960

Groups

 53d Fighter Group: 1 March 1956 – 1 January 1960
 Sioux Gateway Airport, Iowa
 327th Fighter Group: 1 April 19–25 April June 1966
 Truax Field, Wisconsin
 328th Fighter Group: 1 March 1956 – 1 January 1960
 Richards-Gebaur Air Force Base, Missouri
 678th Air Defense Group: 1 March 1970 – 1 March 1983
 Tyndall Air Force Base, Florida
 701st Air Defense Group: 1 March 1970 – 17 January 1974
 Fort Fisher Air Force Station, North Carolina

Squadrons

Fighter-Interceptor
 48th Fighter-Interceptor Squadron: 19 November 1969 – 1 March 1983
 Langley Air Force Base, Virginia
 85th Fighter-Interceptor Squadron: 1 March 1956 – 1 July 1959
 Scott Air Force Base, Illinois
 95th Fighter-Interceptor Squadron: 19 November 1969 – 31 January 1973
 Dover Air Force Base, Delaware

Missile
 22d Air Defense Missile Squadron (BOMARC): 19 November 1969 – 31 October 1972
 Langley Air Force Base, Virginia

Radar

 20th Air Defense Squadron (SAGE), 1 January 1975 – 1 October 1979
 630th Radar Squadron, 1 August 1972 – 31 December 1977
 Houston Intercontinental Airport, Texas
 632d Radar Squadron, 19 November 1969 – 30 September 1978
 Roanoke Rapids Air Force Station, North Carolina
 634th Radar Squadron, 1 January 1973 – 1 July 1974
 Lake Charles Air Force Station, Louisiana
 635th Radar Squadron, 1 January 1973 – 1 June 1974
 Dauphin Island Air Force Station, Alabama
 644th Radar Squadron, 19 November 1969 – 1 April 1978
 Homestead Air Force Base, Florida
 645th Radar Squadron, 19 November 1969 – 1 April 1976
 Patrick Air Force Base, Florida
 649th Radar Squadron, 19 November 1969 – 30 June 1975
 Bedford Air Force Station, Virginia
 650th Aircraft Control and Warning Squadron, 1 March 1956 – 8 October 1957
 Dallas Center Air Force Station, Iowa
 657th Radar Squadron, 19 November 1969 – 30 September 1970
 Bedford Air Force Station, Virginia
 660th Radar Squadron, 19 November 1969 – 15 November 1980
 MacDill Air Force Base, Florida
 671st Radar Squadron, 19 November 1969 – 30 September 1979
 NAS Key West, Florida
 676th Radar Squadron, 1 April 1966 – 1 December 1967
 Antigo Air Force Station, Wisconsin
 678th Radar Squadron, 19 November 1969 – 1 March 1970
 Tyndall Air Force Base, Florida
 679th Radar Squadron, 19 November 1969 – 1 February 1974
 NAS Jacksonville, Florida
 680th Radar Squadron, 19 November 1969 – 30 May 1970
 Palermo Air Force Station, New Jersey
 691st Radar Squadron, 19 November 1969 – 30 September 1970
 Cross City Air Force Station, Florida
 693d Radar Squadron, 19 November 1969 – 30 September 1970
 Dauphin Island Air Force Station, Florida
 701st Radar Squadron, 1 April 1966 – 1 March 1970
 Fort Fisher Air Force Station, North Carolina
 702d Radar Squadron, 19 November 1969 – 9 June 1979
 Savannah Air Force Station, Georgia
 725th Aircraft Control and Warning Squadron, 1 March 1956 – 1 January 1960
 Walnut Ridge Air Force Station, Arkansas
 738th Aircraft Control and Warning Squadron, 1 March 1956 – 1 January 1960
 Olathe Air Force Station, Kansas
 755th Radar Squadron, 1 April 1966 – 1 December 1967
 Williams Bay Air Force Station, Wisconsin
 770th Radar Squadron, 19 November 1969 – 1 February 1974
 Fort George G. Meade, Maryland
 771st Radar Squadron, 19 November 1969 – 1 February 1974
 Cape Charles Air Force Station, Virginia
 782d Radar Squadron, 1 April-25 June 1966
 Rockville Air Force Station, Indiana
 787th Aircraft Control and Warning Squadron, 1 January 1959 – 1 January 1960
 Chandler Air Force Station, Minnesota
 788th Aircraft Control and Warning (later Radar) Squadron, 1 March 1956 – 15 October 1958; 1 April 1966 – 1 December 1967
 Waverly Air Force Station, Iowa
 789th Aircraft Control and Warning Squadron, 1 March 1956 – 1 January 1960
 Omaha Air Force Station, Nebraska
 790th Aircraft Control and Warning (later Radar) Squadron, 1 March 1956 – 1 April 1959; 1 April 1966 – 1 December 1967
 Kirksville Air Force Station, Missouri
 791st Aircraft Control and Warning (later Radar) Squadron, 1 March 1956 – 15 October 1958; 1 April 1966 – 1 December 1967
 Hanna City Air Force Station, Illinois
 792d Radar Squadron, 19 November 1969 – 8 December 1978
 North Charleston Air Force Station, South Carolina
 793d Aircraft Control and Warning Squadron, 1 March 1956 – 1 January 1960
 Hutchinson Air Force Station, Kansas
 796th Aircraft Control and Warning Squadron, 1 March 1956 – 1 June 1961
 Bartlesville Air Force Station, Oklahoma
 797th Aircraft Control and Warning Squadron, 1 March 1956 – 1 June 1961
 Fordland Air Force Station, Missouri
 798th Aircraft Control and Warning (later Radar) Squadron, 1 March 1956 – 1 January 1960
 Belleville Air Force Station, Illinois
 810th Radar Squadron, 19 November 1969 – 31 July 1978
 Winston-Salem Air Force Station, North Carolina
 861st Radar Squadron, 19 November 1969 – 30 June 1975
 Aiken Air Force Station, South Carolina
 4638th Air Defense Squadron (SAGE), 1 January 1972 – 1 January 1975

Aircraft and Missiles

 North American F-86 Sabre, 1956–1959
 Northrop F-89 Scorpion, 1956–1957
 McDonnell F-101 Voodoo, 1959–1960
 Convair F-102 Delta Dagger, 1957–1960
 Convair F-106 Delta Dart, 1969–1981
 CIM-10 BOMARC, 1969–1972; F-15, 1981–1983

See also
 F-89 Scorpion units of the United States Air Force
 List of Sabre and Fury units in the US military
 List of F-106 Delta Dart units of the United States Air Force
 List of United States Air Force Aerospace Defense Command Interceptor Squadrons
 United States general surveillance radar stations

References

Notes

Bibliography

 
 
 

Further reading
 
 
 
 "ADCOM's Fighter Interceptor Squadrons". The Interceptor (January 1979) Aerospace Defense Command, (Volume 21, Number 1)

020
020
Military units and formations established in 1955
Military units and formations disestablished in 1983
1955 establishments in Missouri
1983 disestablishments in Florida